A deadly tornado outbreak severely impacted the Southern United States, and also affected Iowa and Nebraska to a lesser extent, between November 27–30, 2016. The strongest tornadoes of the event affected Alabama and Tennessee during the late evening of November 29 and into the early morning hours of November 30. Overall, this outbreak produced 48 tornadoes, killed six people, and injured many others.

Meteorological synopsis 

On November 27, a storm system produced two EF0s and an EF1 in South Central Nebraska, causing minor damage. On November 28, the Storm Prediction Center (SPC) issued an Enhanced risk of severe weather for Louisiana and Mississippi. Only one tornado touched down in the threat area, a brief EF0 that remained over a rice field near Marksville, Louisiana. However, the surface low associated with system produced a few EF0 tornadoes in Iowa. Minor damage occurred in the towns of Radcliffe and Parkersburg, the latter of which was devastated by an EF5 tornado in May 2008.

The next day, the SPC issued a Moderate risk for central Mississippi and portions of Louisiana, Alabama, and Tennessee. This included a large 10% hatched risk area for tornadoes, and a smaller 15% hatched risk area for tornadoes across northern Mississippi. Throughout the late afternoon and evening, multiple supercell thunderstorms developed. Hail and winds battered Mississippi, and several EF1 tornadoes caused minor to moderate damage in rural areas of the state. After sunset, the event rapidly escalated into a significant outbreak as the intensifying supercell thunderstorms pushed into Alabama, and significant tornadoes began touching down. An EF2 tornado near Belgreen snapped many trees and injured one person when a house was damaged and shifted on its foundation. Two EF2 tornadoes moved through Winston County and heavily damaged or destroyed multiple homes, mobile homes, and outbuildings, and also snapped numerous trees and power poles near Arley and Double Springs. An EF2 tornado touched down over Monte Sano Mountain in eastern Huntsville, snapping and uprooting many trees, and damaging numerous homes as it passed through several subdivisions, a few of which had roofs torn off. A horse riding arena was also destroyed by the Huntsville area tornado. An EF3 tornado passed near the towns of Danville and Neel, causing major structural damage to industrial buildings, homes and a fire station. A motorcycle shop was leveled, vehicles were tossed, and several mobile homes were completely destroyed as well. At around midnight and into the very early morning hours of November 30, the storms moved into northeastern Alabama and southern Tennessee. A powerful EF3 tornado ripped directly through the town of Rosalie and to the north of Ider, killing four people and injuring nine others. The Rosalie/Ider tornado destroyed homes and mobile homes, churches, and businesses along its path. A shopping plaza in Rosalie was leveled by the tornado, and a daycare center near Ider was reduced to a bare slab. Further to the north, strong tornadoes were impacting communities in Tennessee, including an EF3 that severely damaged the town of Ocoee. The Ocoee post office and fire station were destroyed, two people were killed in town, a cell phone tower and a metal truss tower were knocked down, and 20 people were injured. A high-end EF2 tornado struck Athens, destroying several businesses and manufactured homes, heavily damaging a large church complex, and injuring 20 people. A few homes sustained major structural damage and a double-wide mobile home was completely destroyed by another high-end EF2 tornado that passed near Whitwell and Dunlap. After sunrise, additional weaker tornadoes touched down in Louisiana, Alabama, Georgia, Florida, and South Carolina. This included several brief tornadoes that caused minor to moderate damage in and around Atlanta. A high-end EF1 downed many trees and damaged numerous homes in Simpsonville, South Carolina as well before the outbreak came to an end.

Confirmed tornadoes

November 27 event

November 28 event

November 29 event

November 30 event

Notes

References

Tornadoes of 2016
2016 natural disasters in the United States
F3 tornadoes
Tornadoes in Alabama
Tornadoes in Florida
Tornadoes in Georgia (U.S. state)
Tornadoes in Iowa
Tornadoes in Louisiana
Tornadoes in Mississippi
Tornadoes in Nebraska
Tornadoes in South Carolina
Tornadoes in Tennessee
November 2016 events in the United States